Adil Amin (born 13 December 1990) is a Pakistani cricketer who plays for Khyber Pakhtunkhwa. In April 2018, he was named in Khyber Pakhtunkhwa's squad for the 2018 Pakistan Cup. In March 2019, he was named in Khyber Pakhtunkhwa's squad for the 2019 Pakistan Cup.

In September 2019, he was named in Khyber Pakhtunkhwa's squad for the 2019–20 Quaid-e-Azam Trophy tournament. In October 2019, the Pakistan Cricket Board (PCB) named him as one of the six players to watch ahead of the 2019–20 National T20 Cup tournament. In December 2019, he was drafted by the Pakistan Super League (PSL) franchise team Peshawar Zalmi as their Silver Category pick at the 2020 PSL draft.

In January 2021, he was named in Khyber Pakhtunkhwa's squad for the 2020–21 Pakistan Cup.

References

External links
 

1990 births
Living people
Pakistani cricketers
Khyber Pakhtunkhwa cricketers
Peshawar cricketers
Peshawar Zalmi cricketers
Cricketers from Peshawar
South Asian Games bronze medalists for Pakistan
South Asian Games medalists in cricket